Rustlers of Red Dog is a 1935 American Western film serial from Universal Pictures based on the book The Great West That Was by William "Buffalo Bill" Cody. It was a remake of the earlier, 1930 serial The Indians are Coming.

Plot
Jack Wood and his pals make a journey across the West and come up against rustlers, Indian attacks and outlaw gangs. They  make a journey across the West and come up against rustlers, Indian attacks and outlaw gangs.

Cast
 Johnny Mack Brown as Jack Wood
 Joyce Compton as Mary Lee
 Raymond Hatton as Laramie
 Walter Miller as "Deacon"
 Harry Woods as "Rocky"
 Fred MacKaye as Snakey
 William Desmond as Ira Dale, the Wagonmaster
 Charles K. French as Tom Lee 
 J.P. McGowan as Capt. Trent
 Lafe McKee as Bob Lee
 Edmund Cobb as Henchman Buck 
 Chief Thundercloud as Chief Grey Wolf 
 Chief Many Treaties as Indian
 Jim Thorpe as Chief Scarface

Production

Stunts
Cliff Lyons
George Magrill
Frank McCarroll 
Wally West

Chapter titles
 Hostile Redskins
 Flaming Arrows
 Thundering Hoofs [sic]
 Attack at Dawn
 Buried Alive
 Flames of Vengeance
 Into the Depths
 Paths of Peril
 The Snake Strikes
 Riding Wild
 The Rustlers Clash
 Law and Order
Source:

See also
 List of film serials
 List of film serials by studio

References

External links

1935 films
American black-and-white films
1930s English-language films
Films based on American novels
Films based on Western (genre) novels
Universal Pictures film serials
Films directed by Lew Landers
1935 Western (genre) films
American Western (genre) films
Films with screenplays by George H. Plympton
1930s American films